The 2014–15 Kansas State Wildcats women's basketball team represented Kansas State University in the 2014–15 NCAA Division I women's basketball season. The Wildcats were led by first-year head coach Jeff Mittie. They played their home games at Bramlage Coliseum in Manhattan, Kansas and were members of the Big 12 Conference. They finished the season 19–14, 7–11 in Big 12 play to finish in a tie for seventh place. They lost in the quarterfinals of the Big 12 women's tournament where they lost to Baylor. They were invited to the Women's National Invitation Tournament where they defeated Akron in the first round before losing to Missouri in the second round.

Roster

Schedule and results 

|-
!colspan=9 style="background:#512888; color:#FFFFFF;"| Exhibition

|-
!colspan=9 style="background:#512888; color:#FFFFFF;"| Regular season

|-
!colspan=9 style="background:#FFFFFF; color:#512888;"| 2015 Big 12 women's basketball tournament

|-
!colspan=9 style="background:#FFFFFF; color:#512888;"| WNIT

 The November 26 game vs. Santa Clara and November 27 game vs. UTEP were canceled due to a facility conflict. Both of these games were not rescheduled.

See also 
 2014–15 Kansas State Wildcats men's basketball team

References 

Kansas State Wildcats women's basketball seasons
Kansas State